Jake Spencer may refer to:

Jake Spencer (footballer) (born 1989), Australian rules footballer
Jacob Spencer, a fictional character in General Hospital